The Launceston Casino City is a defunct Australian professional basketball team that competed in the National Basketball League (NBL). Formed in 1980, the club was based in Launceston, Tasmania. It lasted only three seasons before folding, but won the NBL Championship in 1981. The Launceston Casino City was last coached by Curtis Coleman.

History 
The Launceston Casino City entered the NBL competition with a grant from the Tasmanian Government and the support of the developers of the state's second casino. Their highest profile player was 24-year-old Ian Davies, who  played for the Australian team at the 1980 Summer Olympics in Moscow and later at the 1984 Summer Olympics in Los Angeles.

In its first season the team finished ninth in the 12-team NBL competition, winning nine of its 22 games. Davies was named in the 1980 All NBL First Team.

In the 1981 NBL season Launceston Casino City improved to 14 wins and finished fourth in the regular season. In the first semi-final, which consisted of a single sudden-death game, the Launceston Casino City defeated the Brisbane Bullets 71 to 69 points. They then met the Nunawading Spectres in the Grand Final at Apollo Stadium in Adelaide, which they won 75 to 54 points to claim the NBL Championship.

In its third and final NBL season in 1982, the Launceston Casino City won 5 games and finished 12th.

Michael Parsons, who went on to play in the South Australian National Football League with the North Adelaide Roosters and the Australian Football League with the Sydney Swans, played for the team. Cliff Martin also played for the Casino City as an American import player.

The Launceston Casino City basketball team folded in 1983.

In 2009 it was reported that the championship cup and banner that was won by the team in 1981 was missing. The banner was found in a Hobart shed ten years later.

Honour roll

Season by season

References

External links 
 NBL official website

Basketball teams in Tasmania
Defunct National Basketball League (Australia) teams
Basketball teams established in 1980
Basketball teams disestablished in 1982
Sport in Launceston, Tasmania
1980 establishments in Australia